Bulwell Hall Estate is a council estate in the City of Nottingham, and is located in the Bulwell ward. Surrounding areas include Hucknall and Bestwood Village towards the north, Rise Park to the east and Bulwell to the south. At the 2001 Census, the estate had a population of 2,181.

Facilities
Most facilities in the estate are located on Hucknall Road and include a Screwfix store, a car wash, a convenience store, a Kwik Fit and takeaways as well as a primary school, a community centre and a care home located on Lawton Drive.

Demographics
According to the data of the 2001 Census, the estate has a population of 2,181, and a majority of the population are aged 25–44, who make up 28.7% of the population.

The census also shows that 94.3% of the population is White British, as well as 0.5% being White Irish and 1.3% being classed as Other White. 2.0% of the population is Mixed Race, 0.3% is Asian or Asian British and 1.6% of the estate's population is Black or Black British.

Religion
The 2001 Census shows that 52.1% of the population are Christian as well as Atheists who make up 31.% of the population. 0.3% of the population is Muslim, other religions make up 0.4% of the estate's population and 15.2% of the population haven't stated their religion.

Transport

Tram services
The Moor Bridge tram stop is located within the estate, and has frequent services to Hucknall and Toton Lane as part of NET's Line 1 service.

Bus services
The estate has frequent bus services that travel through Hucknall Road by several different bus companies, mostly services ran by Nottingham City Transport.

References

Areas of Nottingham